Andrew Ilie was the defending champion but lost in the quarterfinals to Xavier Malisse. Andy Roddick won in the final 6–2, 6–4 against Malisse, earning the first title of his career.

Seeds
A champion seed is indicated in bold text while text in italics indicates the round in which that seed was eliminated.

  Andre Agassi (first round)
  Todd Martin (second round)
  Michael Chang (second round)
  Rainer Schüttler (second round)
  Andrew Ilie (quarterfinals)
  Jérôme Golmard (semifinals)
  Olivier Rochus (first round)
  Magnus Gustafsson (second round)

Draw

External links
 2001 Verizon Tennis Challenge draw

2001 Singles
2001 ATP Tour